Biersted is a town in North Jutland, Denmark. It is located in Jammerbugt Municipality.

History
The town was originally named Bjergsted.

A train station was built in Biersted in 1896 by Paul Severin Arved Paulsen. The station was in use between 1897 and 1969. It was a stop on the Fjerritslev-Nørresundby railroad.

References

Cities and towns in the North Jutland Region
Jammerbugt Municipality